Candy Stripe Nurses is a 1974 American comedy film written and directed by Alan Holleb, and starring Candice Rialson. Produced and distributed by New World Pictures, it was the last in their popular "nurses cycle" of films that commenced with The Student Nurses (1970).

Plot
Three high school girls work as volunteer candy stripe nurses at Oakwood Hospital. Free-loving Sandy (Candice Rialson) meets a famous rock star, Owen Boles (Kendrew Lascelles), and tries to cure him of his sexual problems. Uptight Dianne (Robin Mattson), who wants to be a doctor, has an affair with Cliff (Rod Haase), a star college basketball player who is being given speed by one of the hospital's doctors, and tries to expose the malpractice. Juvenile delinquent Marisa (Maria Rojo) has an affair with Carlos (Roger Cruz), who is falsely accused of taking part in a gas station hold up, and tries to prove his innocence.

Cast
Candice Rialson as Sandy
Robin Mattson as Dianne
María Rojo as Marisa 
Roger Cruz as Carlos
Rod Haase as Cliff Gallagher
Richard Gates as Wally
Don Keefer as Dr. Wilson
Kendrew Lascelles as Owen Boles
Tara Strohmeier as Irene

Production
Director Allan Holleb had recently graduated from UCLA. Julie Corman gave him the job on this film after being impressed by a short film he had made, Heavenly Star. Holleb later said "I found out they had taken a poll at a local high school. They sent someone out with a list of 30 or so titles and Candy Stripe Nurses got the most votes...  They wanted a little social consciousness, a little romance, a little comedy and a little sex. Another requirement was they wanted a sex clinic. I don't know why!"

Barbara Peeters was second unit director.

The lead role when to Candice Rialson. "Candice just stood out," recalled Julie Corman. "It wasn't like we were down to the wire and needed someone at the last minute. We really wanted her from the beginning."

A small role was given to Sally Kirkland who Holleb says was a friend of Julie Corman's who also worked on casting.

The movie downplayed the political element that featured in earlier nurses films in favour of humour, although it was still there.

Shooting
The film was shot at a hospital in Burbank. Holleb says Julie Corman gave the board of directors an expurgated copy of the script under the title of Angels of Mercy to get permission.

Holleb says the hospital was at 95% capacity during the shoot meaning there were frequent clashes between staff and crew. He says while shooting a scene in a linen closet with a topless Candice Rialson, someone from the linen service came in and saw her. Then an un-expurgated copy of the script was found and the unit was kicked out of the hospital. They had to move to another location, a former clinic, which did not match the original hospital. Holleb got the art director to put up a sign saying "this way to the new west wing" to justify the completely new look.

Release
The film was released on a double bill in some cities with The Swinging Cheerleaders.

It was the last in the New World cycle of "nurse's pictures". Holleb later joked "I like to think I killed the genre."

Diabolique magazine said that "Rialson is vivacious and cheerful, delivering comic lines with aplomb and seeming almost wholesome as she constantly takes her clothes and off hops into bed with various men – she makes nudity and sex appear like natural, clean fun, never sleazy; you only wish she had a better storyline."

See also
 List of American films of 1974

References

Notes

External links

1970s exploitation films
1974 films
1970s English-language films
Films about nurses
Films produced by Julie Corman
Teensploitation
American exploitation films
1970s American films